Jesús María Eguiguren Imaz (born 2 June 1954, Aizarnazabal, Gipuzkoa) is a Spanish academic, jurist, politician, and member of the Socialist Party of the Basque Country–Basque Country Left (PSE-EE). Eguiguren served as a member of the Basque Parliament from 1983 to 2012, including a tenure as the second President of the Basque Parliament from 8 January 1987 until 18 December 1990. He later became the President of the PSE-EE-PSOE political party from 2002 to 2014.

Life

He studied Law at the University of the Basque Country. In the 2000s, Eguiguren represented the government during peace talks with ETA.

Eguiguren was born in Aizarnazabal, Gipuzkoa, in 1954. He is married to Rafaela Romero, a lawyer and member of the Basque Parliament.

References

1954 births
Living people
Members of the 1st Basque Parliament
Members of the 2nd Basque Parliament
Members of the 3rd Basque Parliament
Members of the 4th Basque Parliament
Members of the 5th Basque Parliament
Members of the 6th Basque Parliament
Members of the 7th Basque Parliament
Members of the 8th Basque Parliament
Members of the 9th Basque Parliament
Presidents of the Basque Parliament
Socialist Party of the Basque Country–Basque Country Left politicians
Spanish Socialist Workers' Party politicians
People from Urola Kosta